Gear manufacturing refers to the making of gears. Gears can be manufactured by a variety of processes, including casting, forging, extrusion, powder metallurgy, and blanking. As a general rule, however, machining is applied to achieve the final dimensions, shape and surface finish in the gear. The initial operations that produce a semifinishing part ready for gear machining as referred to as blanking operations; the starting product in gear machining is called a gear blank.

Selection of materials 
The gear material should have the following properties:

 High tensile strength to prevent failure against static loads
 High endurance strength to withstand dynamic loads
 Low coefficient of friction
 Good manufacturability

Gear manufacturing processes 
There are multiple ways in which gear blanks can be shaped through the cutting and finishing processes.

Gear forming 
In gear form cutting, the cutting edge of the cutting tool has a shape identical with the shape of the space between the gear teeth. Two machining operations, milling and broaching can be employed to form cut gear teeth.

Form milling 
In form milling, the cutter called a form cutter travels axially along the length of the gear tooth at the appropriate depth to produce the gear tooth. After each tooth is cut, the cutter is withdrawn, the gear blank is rotated, and the cutter proceeds to cut another tooth. The process continues until all teeth are cut

Broaching 
Broaching can also be used to produce gear teeth and is particularly applicable to internal teeth. The process is rapid and produces fine surface finish with high dimensional accuracy. However, because broaches are expensive and a separate broach is required for each size of gear, this method is suitable mainly for high-quality production.

Gear generation 
In gear generation, the tooth flanks are obtained as an outline of the subsequent positions of the cutter, which resembles in shape the mating gear in the gear pair. There are two machining processes employed shaping and milling. There are several modifications of these processes for different cutting tool used.

Gear hobbing 
Gear hobbing is a machining process in which gear teeth are progressively generated by a series of cuts with a helical cutting tool.  All motions in hobbing are rotary, and the hob and gear blank rotate continuously as in two gears meshing until all teeth are cut.

Finishing operations 
As produced by any of the process described, the surface finish and dimensional accuracy may not 
be accurate enough for certain applications. Several finishing operations are available, including the 
conventional process of shaving, and a number of abrasive operations, including grinding, honing, and lapping.

See also 
 American Gear Manufacturers Association, standards organization for gears

References 

Gears